Kallettumkara  is a village which is the epi-centre town of Aloor Panchayat and is in Thrissur district in the state of Kerala. Kaletumkara is the Western border of newly formed Chalakudy Taluk although it elects it Legislative Assembly Candidate from Irinjalakuda Constituency, India.

References

Villages in Thrissur district